Dr. Hedgewar Hospital (officially known as Dr. Hedgewar Rugnalaya; Marathi: डॉ. हेडगेवार रुग्णालय) is an hospital and Medical institution located in Aurangabad, Maharashtra. Established by Babasaheb Ambedkar Vaidyakeeya Pratishthan. The hospital was founded by young doctors inspired by the ideology of the Rashtriya Swayamsevak Sangh, a nationalist pan-India organisation.

Services
Today it has 300 beds and runs medical services in many specialities. The hospital runs several social upliftment programs like AIDS awareness, upliftment of women, kindergarten schools, self-employment, etc. in slum areas of Aurangabad.

Visits
People like Ratan Tata, Harsha Bhogle, and Anne Heiberg-Blackwill (Robert Blackwill's wife) have visited and lauded the work of the hospital and its staff.

External links 
Official website
Buildings and structures in Aurangabad, Maharashtra
Hospitals in Maharashtra
Year of establishment missing